Caryomyia sanguinolenta, also known as hickory smooth gumdrop gall midge, is a species of gall midge in the family Cecidomyiidae.

References

Further reading

External links

 

Cecidomyiinae
Insects described in 1862
Gall-inducing insects